Mario-Philippe Losembe Batwanyele (born Mario-Philippe Cardoso, 29 September 1933) is a Congolese politician and diplomat. He is currently serving as the second vice president of the Senate of the Democratic Republic of the Congo.

Biography 
Mario-Philippe Losembe Batwanyele was born as Mario-Philippe Cardoso on 29 September 1933 in Stanleyville, Belgian Congo to a Portuguese father and Lokele mother who originated from the Yaokandja sector of the Isangi Territory. He earned his secondary education at St. Joseph's Institute in Léopoldville, graduating in late 1953. The following September he enrolled in the Université catholique de Louvain's Institute of Applied Psychology and Pedagogy. In 1958 he earned a degree in psychology and pedagogy. Losembe subsequently became a research assistant at Lovanium University. He was selected by Patrice Lumumba to lead the Mouvement National Congolais delegation to the economic portion of the Belgo-Congolese Round Table Conference in Brussels from 26 April to 16 May 1960. On his initiative the delegations formed a "Front National" to develop a unified negotiating position. Following the independence of the Congo, Losembe served as secretary-general of the Ministry of Education, though he resigned after only a few weeks in office.

Losembe led the Congolese delegation to the United Nations from 1960 to 1961. He served as chargé d'affaires to the United States from 1962 until 1965. He served as President Joseph-Désiré Mobutu's education minister from 1969 until 1970. He subsequently held the office of foreign minister from 1970 to 1972. That year, Mobutu accused Losembe of embezzling government funds appropriated for the Revolutionary Government of Angola in Exile, causing the latter to shortly thereafter flee to Europe. Losembe returned to the country after a general amnesty was declared in November 1974.

In 2007 he was elected to the Congolese Senate as a member of the Forces du Renouveau party to represent Orientale Province. He was shortly thereafter elected Second Vice President of the Senate by members of the body, 57 to 49.

Losembe is the father of Congolese businessman Michel Losembe.

Citations

References 

 
 
 
 
 
 
 
 
 
 

 

1933 births
Living people
People of the Congo Crisis
Catholic University of Leuven (1834–1968) alumni
Mouvement National Congolais politicians
People from Kisangani
Academic staff of Lovanium University
Democratic Republic of the Congo exiles
Foreign Ministers of the Democratic Republic of the Congo
Democratic Republic of the Congo diplomats
Democratic Republic of the Congo people of Portuguese descent
21st-century Democratic Republic of the Congo people